Tarnowiec  is a village in Jasło County, Subcarpathian Voivodeship, in south-eastern Poland. It is the seat of the gmina (administrative district) called Gmina Tarnowiec.

The village has a population of 1,200.

References

Tarnowiec